The China Compulsory Certificate mark, commonly known as a CCC Mark, is a compulsory safety mark for many products imported, sold or used in the Chinese market. It was implemented on May 1, 2002 and became fully effective on August 1, 2003.

It is the result of the integration of China's two previous compulsory inspection systems, namely "CCIB" (Safety Mark, introduced in 1989 and required for products in 47 product categories) and "CCEE" (also known as "Great Wall" Mark, for electrical commodities in 7 product categories), into a single procedure.

Applicable products 
The CCC mark is required for both Chinese-manufactured and foreign-imported products; the certification process involves the Guobiao standards. 

The mandatory products include, among others:
 Electrical wires and cables
 Circuit switches, electric devices for protection or connection
 Low-voltage Electrical Apparatus
 Low power motors
 Electric tools
 Welding machines
 Household and similar electrical appliances
 Audio and video apparatus (not including the audio apparatus for broadcasting service and automobiles)
 Information technology equipment
 Lighting apparatus (not including the lighting apparatus with the voltage lower than 36V)
 Motor vehicles and safety accessories
 Motor vehicle Tires
 Safety Glasses
 Agricultural Machinery
 Telecommunication Terminal Products
 Fire Fighting Equipment
 Safety Protection Products
 Wireless LAN products
 Decoration Materials
 Toys

Implementation rules 
Apart from the GB Standard, the implementation rules are the second important component that form the basis of CCC certification. The implementation rules determine the process of the CCC-Certification and list the mandatory products for the certification. Based on many regulatory amendments, it is important to get the latest version of the implementation rules before starting the certification process.

In 2014, a comprehensive regulatory amendment of the Implementation Rules had taken place. The major changes are:
 Amendments for Automotive Parts
Introduction of factory levels (A-D)
Self-made products for end products do not require a CCC Certificate anymore

Administration 
The CCC mark is administered by the CNCA (Certification and Accreditation Administration of the People's Republic of China). The China Quality Certification Center (CQC) is designated by CNCA to process CCC mark applications and defines the products that need CCC. The products are summed up in overall product categories. 
Additionally, the following certification authorities are responsible for specific groups of products:
CCAP (China Certification Centre for Automotive Products) products in the automotive area
CSP (China Certification Center for Security and Protection) certifies security products, forensic technology and products for road safety
CSCG (China Safety Global Certification Centre) for safety glass
CEMC (China Certification Centre for Electromagnetic Compatibility) all electronic products

Follow-up certification 

The CCC certificate and the Permission of Printing, which allows the manufacturer to mark the CCC-certified product with the CCC mark, must be renewed annually in order to keep the validity of the certificate. The renewal can only be done through a follow-up certification. Part of the follow-up certification is a one-day factory audit.

IT security products 
On April 27, 2009, China announced 13 categories of the IT security sector products that must conform to the additional authority that was newly bestowed on the CCC (China Compulsory Certificate), and this requirement was to be put into effect on May 1, 2009. In view of the security measures taken by China, there was a seemingly high likelihood that they would request the full disclosure of all source codes running on any and all devices, imported or otherwise.  The divulgence of such source codes is of great concern to countries like the U.S., Japan, the EU, and South Korea; all four asked China to reverse this decision and objected to the implementation of the Chinese plan.  Thus, the certification agents were soon limited to the organizations and entities within China - a compromise of sorts.  However, despite this restriction, there still arose other concerns as to whether source codes and trade secrets could be leaked to the private sectors.  In response to these enduring concerns, China altered the previously planned CCC policy programme.  Instead of administering broad and stringent encroachments upon the relevant categories of imports (primarily, computer technology), they decided to engage in an alternate regulatory action solely affecting government procurement projects, while simultaneously  postponing the enactment of the policy programme to May 1, 2010.  China also stated that the number of applicable CCC product categories is not to expand past the current 13 already in place.

Protection of intellectual property in the CCC certification
Although the CCC-Certification’s only purpose is to ensure compliance of products with the Chinese standards, many companies are worried that infringements of their trademarks or patent occur during the CCC-Certification. 
Especially regarding the following steps, companies are troubled: 
Comprehensive product information for the application are required 
Type test of the products in an accredited test laboratory in China 
Factory audit by Chinese inspectors examine the factory

For the best possible protection for the own products there are: 
Protecting Intellectual Property Rights in China

See also 
 Common Criteria
 National Development and Reform Commission

References

External links
China Compulsory Certification 

2002 introductions
Certification marks
Economy of China
Safety codes
Foreign trade of China